Karel Růžička (born May 11, 1909, date of death unknown) was a Czechoslovakian bobsledder who competed in the 1930s. He won a silver medal in the two-man event at the 1935 FIBT World Championships in Igls.

Ruzicka also competed at the 1936 Winter Olympics in Garmisch-Partenkirchen, finishing 20th in the two-man event and did not finish the four-man event.

References
1936 bobsleigh two-man results
1936 bobsleigh four-man results
Bobsleigh two-man world championship medalists since 1931
Karel Růžička's profile at Sports Reference.com

1909 births
Czechoslovak male bobsledders
Olympic bobsledders of Czechoslovakia
Bobsledders at the 1936 Winter Olympics
Year of death missing